At the 1936 Summer Olympics in Berlin, four diving events were contested, two for men, and two for women. The competitions were held from Monday 10 August 1936 to Saturday 15 August 1936.

Medal summary

The events are labelled as 3 metre springboard and 10 metre platform by the International Olympic Committee, and appeared on the 1937 Official Report as springboard diving and high diving, respectively. Following the reduction of the springboard events to the 3 metre height, in 1932, the platform events were also reduced to dives from the 10 metre platform, but only for men. Meanwhile, women still dived from both 10 and 5 metre heights.

Men

Women

Participating nations
A total of 69 divers (39 men and 30 women) from 21 nations (men from 20 nations - women from 11 nations) competed at the Berlin Games:

  (men:1 women:0)
  (men:1 women:2)
  (men:1 women:2)
  (men:3 women:0)
  (men:0 women:2)
  (men:4 women:0)
  (men:1 women:0)
  (men:1 women:1)
  (men:5 women:6)
  (men:2 women:4)
  (men:2 women:0)
  (men:3 women:0)
  (men:2 women:3)
  (men:1 women:0)
  (men:1 women:0)
  (men:1 women:2)
  (men:1 women:0)
  (men:1 women:2)
  (men:2 women:1)
  (men:5 women:5)
  (men:1 women:0)

Medal table

Notes

References
 
 

 
1936 Summer Olympics events
1936
1936 in water sports